Manuel Centeno (born 18 September 1980) is a former bodyboarding European and World Champion, having won the ISA World Surfing Games 2006 on 22 October, at Huntington Beach, California, United States.

Profile
Manuel Centeno was born in Porto, Portugal, he started practicing bodyboarding at the age of 14, and at the age of 16 he had already won some local trophies. Besides practicing professional bodyboarding, Manuel Centeno has finished in December 2006, the architecture degree, at the University of Porto.

 2000 - Portuguese Champion
 2001 - European Champion
 2006 - Portuguese Champion
 2006 - European Champion
 2006 - World Champion

References

Living people
1980 births
Portuguese surfers
Sportspeople from Porto